Ramón Sandoval (born 23 September 1931) is a Chilean middle-distance runner. He competed in the men's 800 metres at the 1956 Summer Olympics.

References

1931 births
Living people
Athletes (track and field) at the 1956 Summer Olympics
Chilean male middle-distance runners
Olympic athletes of Chile
Place of birth missing (living people)
Pan American Games medalists in athletics (track and field)
Pan American Games bronze medalists for Chile
Athletes (track and field) at the 1951 Pan American Games
Athletes (track and field) at the 1955 Pan American Games
Athletes (track and field) at the 1959 Pan American Games
Medalists at the 1955 Pan American Games